Arablu (also Romanized as ‘Arablū) is a village in Aliabad Rural District, in the Central District of Hashtrud County, East Azerbaijan Province, Iran. At the 2006 census, its population was 39, in 7 families.

References 

Towns and villages in Hashtrud County